Awaludin bin Said is a Malaysian politician and served as Speaker of the Negeri Sembilan State Legislative Assembly.

Election results

Honours
 :
  Medal for Outstanding Public Service (PMC)
  Member of the Order of Loyalty to Negeri Sembilan (ANS)
  Knight Companion of the Order of Loyalty to Negeri Sembilan (DSNS) – Dato’ (2006)
  Knight Grand Companion of Order of Loyalty to Negeri Sembilan (SSNS) – Dato’ Seri (2018)

References

United Malays National Organisation politicians
Members of the Negeri Sembilan State Legislative Assembly
21st-century Malaysian politicians
Living people
Year of birth missing (living people)
People from Negeri Sembilan
Malaysian people of Malay descent
Malaysian Muslims